June Gale (born June Gilmartin; July 6, 1911 – November 13, 1996) was an American actress sometimes credited under her married name as June Levant.

Biography
Born in San Francisco, Gale rose to fame as part of the vaudeville act The Gale Sisters, a dancing quadruplet act that was actually two sets of twins. She appeared on Broadway with her sisters in Flying High (1930) and George White's Scandals (1931). In the early 1930s, she made her first films in Hollywood originally as a Goldwyn Girl in Roman Scandals, and gradually she rose to more notable parts, generally in B movies after signing with Fox in 1936. 

In December 1939, Gale married Oscar Levant in Fredericksburg, Virginia, and they remained wed until his death in 1972. She later married Henry Ephron.

Gale was an integral part of two TV talk shows. After an on-air disagreement led to her leaving her co-host role on The Oscar Levant Show, she began her own show in 1958, with Lloyd Thaxton.

Death
Gale died of pneumonia on November 13, 1996, aged 85, at Ceders-Sinai Medical Center. She was buried at Pierce Brothers Westwood Memorial Park in Los Angeles, California.

Filmography

References

External links

1911 births
1996 deaths
American film actresses
Actresses from San Francisco
20th-century American actresses
American stage actresses
Vaudeville performers
Ephron family
Deaths from pneumonia in California